Alexander Forrest CMG (22 September 1849 – 20 June 1901) was an explorer and surveyor of Western Australia, and later also a member of parliament.

As a government surveyor, Forrest explored many areas of remote Western Australia, particularly the Kimberley region. Several of his expeditions were conducted alongside his brother, John Forrest, who became the first Premier of Western Australia. In later life, Forrest served in the unicameral Legislative Council from 1887 to 1890, representing the seat of Kimberley. Following the advent of responsible government, he was elected to the Legislative Assembly, representing the seat of West Kimberley from 1890 until his death. He was also mayor of Perth on two occasions, from 1892 to 1895 and from 1897 to 1900.

Early life
Forrest was born at Picton, near Bunbury in Western Australia, the fourth of nine sons of William and Margaret Forrest. He was educated at the government school in Bunbury under John Hislop, then completed his education at Hale School in Perth.

Exploring career
Forrest explored areas of Western Australia under contract to the Survey Department, particularly the Kimberley region, during the 1870s and 1880s. 
Much of his exploration was done with his brother John Forrest who became the first Premier of Western Australia.

In 1870, a party of six men including Alexander and his brother John left Perth.  Five months later they reached Adelaide.  In 1874, Alexander was part of another party again including brother John which took a more northerly route from Geraldton to the east to the Murchison River.

In 1879, Alexander led his own expedition of eight men from De Grey River to the telegraph line into the area now known as the Kimberley. The expedition left on 25 February 1879 and reached Beagle Bay on 10 April 1879. The coast was then skirted to the Fitzroy River which was followed for 240 miles (390 km); but Forrest's progress was then stopped by mountains which appeared to be impassable. He eventually worked round the southern end of the range and discovered some valuable country. Good water was found until the Victoria River was reached on 18 August 1879, but great difficulties were met with before reaching the telegraph line 13 days later. From there they made their way to Palmerston, then the capital of the Northern Territory, and they arrived on 7 October 1879. The party was often in danger of starvation, on more than one occasion a packhorse had to be killed for food, and in the last dash for the telegraph line, Forrest and one companion who had gone on ahead almost perished from thirst. The two Aboriginal assistants were quite helpless for the last 300 miles (480 km) of the journey, and one of them never recovered from its effects, dying a few months later. The expedition ranks among the most valuable pieces of Australian exploration as large tracts of good pasturage were discovered. Forrest published his Journal of Expedition from De Grey to Port Darwin in Perth in 1880.

In 1891, through a syndicate comprising Charles Crossland and George Leake, Alexander Forrest commenced the subdivision of what would later become the affluent Perth suburb of Peppermint Grove.  He was also associated with the first of three quarries that exist on the edge of Greenmount Hill. In 1893, he negotiated the contract with the Adelaide Steamship Company for serving Western Australian ports.

Political career
In 1887, Forrest became a politician, entering the Western Australian Legislative Council as the first (and only) member for the seat of Kimberley. He was then elected to the Legislative Assembly for West Kimberley in 1890, and held the seat until his death. He was also Mayor of Perth 1893–95 and 1898–1900, and later an investor. He was made a Companion of the Order of St Michael and St George (CMG) on 15 May 1901, in preparation of the forthcoming royal visit of the Duke and Duchess of Cornwall and York (later King George V and Queen Mary).

Forrest died on 20 June 1901 at Perth of complications arising from kidney trouble. He was survived by four of his five children (his son Anthony Alexander Forrest having been killed the month before in the Second Boer War), and was buried at Karrakatta Cemetery.

References

Further reading
 Forrest, Alexander. North-West exploration : journal of expedition from DeGrey to Port Darwin. Perth : Gov. Printer, 1880. 43 p. Western Australia. Parliamentary paper ; No. 3, 1880
 Accompanying map: "Map showing the route from Nickol Bay to S.A. telegraph ..." by Chas Youle Dean

External links

Photograph at the ACT Heritage Library Image Library

1849 births
1901 deaths
Australian explorers
Burials at Karrakatta Cemetery
Explorers of Australia
Explorers of Western Australia
People educated at Hale School
People from Bunbury, Western Australia
Mayors and Lord Mayors of Perth, Western Australia
Members of the Western Australian Legislative Assembly
Members of the Western Australian Legislative Council
19th-century Australian politicians